The 2008 Tour of Ireland took place between Wednesday 27 August 2008 to Sunday 31 August 2008.

Stages

Classification

General Classification

Teams Classification

Jersey Progress

References

External links
2008 Tour of Ireland at Cycling News

Tour of Ireland
Tour of Ireland, 2008
Tour of Ireland